Alfred Redl (14 March 1864 – 25 May 1913) was an Austrian military officer who rose to head the Evidenzbureau, the
counterintelligence wing of the General Staff of the Austro-Hungarian Army. Redl was one of the leading figures of pre-World War I espionage; his term in office was marked by radical innovations and the use of advanced technology to ensnare foreign spies.

Due to the innovations he introduced, Redl's successor, Major Maximilian Ronge, ultimately learned in 1913 that Redl was also a highly paid spy, working for the intelligence service of the Imperial Russian Army. Upon being exposed as a Russian spy, Redl committed suicide.

Although Redl's homosexuality was publicized during the affair, later investigation of Russian archives revealed that his Russian handlers had no knowledge of it, and his sexuality was unrelated to his decision to spy. Instead, he was enticed by the material benefits. Redl's revelations did not have a significant effect on the course of World War I.

Early career
Born in Lemberg, Galicia, Austrian Empire (now Lviv, Ukraine), Redl came from a relatively poor family, his father being a railway clerk. His ability enabled Redl to rise quickly within the officer ranks of the Austro-Hungarian Army, in spite of lacking the advantages of wealth or family connections. Redl attended the War School in Vienna, which normally accepted only 50 entrants a year from about a thousand applicants. Acquiring a specialist interest in Russian military issues, Redl joined the Intelligence Bureau of the Austro-Hungarian General Staff and in 1900 was assigned to the Russian Section.

Counter-intelligence work
By 1907 Redl had become head of the counter-intelligence branch of the Intelligence Bureau. Promoted to the rank of colonel, Redl greatly improved the methods used by the Austro-Hungarian counter-espionage service, introducing such technological innovations as the use of cameras and primitive recording devices, while creating a database of fingerprint records of persons of interest. However, at the same time, Redl himself became a spy for Russia and his subsequent exposure was largely due to the improvements he had developed himself.

Treason
Redl's motives for treason are still unclear.  He may have been caught in a compromising position by Russian agents, because he was homosexual and being exposed as such would have been fatal to his career prospects.  In fact, Russian military intelligence, based in Warsaw at the time, under the command of Colonel Nikolai Batyushin, had discovered Redl's homosexuality as early as 1901, information that was used to blackmail him into revealing classified information. In 1902, he reportedly passed a copy of Austro-Hungarian war plans to the Russians. General von Gieslingen, head of Austro-Hungarian military intelligence, delegated Redl himself to investigate the source of this leak. In consultation with his Russian contacts, Redl identified several low-level agents as Russian spies, thereby protecting himself and enhancing his reputation for efficiency.

Redl was paid well by the Imperial Russian government for his services, and acquired a lifestyle far beyond what his official salary could cover.  It would appear that there was also a strong element of vanity involved, as well as a taste for danger. A Russian report of 1907 describes Redl as "more sly and false than intelligent and talented", a cynic "who enjoys dissipation."

From 1903 to 1913, Redl was Russia's leading spy. Before World War I, he provided the Russians with information of Plan III, the entire Austrian invasion plan for Serbia. The Russians then informed the Serbian military command about Plan III. As a result, when the Austro-Hungarian Army invaded Serbia, the Serbians were well prepared. Redl not only provided many of Austria's military secrets and plans, but he also supplied incorrect estimates of Russian military strength to his own military authorities. Redl has been called one of history's greatest traitors because purportedly his actions were responsible for the deaths of half a million of his countrymen.

Redl is thought to have sold to Russia one of Austria's principal attack plans, along with its order of battle, its mobilization plans (at a time when mobilization was viewed as one of the critical keys to victory) and detailed plans of Austrian fortifications that were soon overrun by Russia. He is known beyond question to have sent Austrian agents into Russia and then to have sold them out. He also had Austrian agents within the Russian Imperial Staff, but betrayed them too, to be hanged or to commit suicide. He is also believed to have informed on various Russian officers who contacted Austro-Hungarian intelligence.

Exposure 
In 1912, Redl became chief of staff of the VIII Corps under his old commander, Arthur Giesl von Gieslingen. When he left the counter-intelligence service, Redl was succeeded by Major Maximilian Ronge, a man trained by Redl himself. Ronge instigated the practice of checking suspicious mail. One suspect envelope – a poste restante letter to be returned unclaimed – was found to contain a large sum of money as well as references to known espionage cover addresses.

On 9 May 1913, a duplicate letter with money was posted to the same cover name, "Nikon Nizetas". Police detectives were assigned to monitor the post office and follow whoever claimed it. When the letter was finally claimed on 25 May, police pursued, but lost contact when the person who had picked up the letter left in a taxi. But while the detectives stood wondering what to do, the taxi that the suspect had taken returned.

The police detectives took the taxi and asked to be driven to the address that the previous customer had been taken to. The taxi driver took them to the hotel Klomser and during the ride there, they found a pen-knife sheath in the taxi. Arriving at the hotel, they told the management to ask the guests if any of them had lost the sheath and then waited in the lobby. When a guest arrived to claim it, the detectives recognized their former boss, Colonel Alfred Redl.

Redl was subsequently confronted in his apartment by a party of military officers. In the course of a brief interrogation he admitted selling military intelligence to a foreign power. Field Marshal Franz Conrad von Hötzendorf, the Austro-Hungarian Army's Chief of Staff, ordered that Colonel Redl was to be left alone with a loaded revolver. Redl shot himself in the early morning of 25 May 1913.

Legacy 
Redl's death was regretted both by the Emperor Franz Josef, who would have preferred that the colonel avoided dying in mortal sin, and by Austrian Intelligence, which would have preferred to interrogate him on the full extent of his disclosures to the Russians.

In the political post-mortem one Hungarian newspaper noted that "the Redl affair cannot be seen as a private matter.  Redl is not an individual but a system.  Whilst soldiers elsewhere are taught to love their homelands, lack of patriotism is held to be the greatest military virtue in this unfortunate monarchy.  With us military education culminates in all national feeling being driven out of our soldiers... In the Redl affair this spirit has had its revenge.  The Austrian and the Hungarian soldiers possess no fatherland; they only have a war lord."

In popular culture
 Historian Robert B. Asprey wrote The Panther's Feast about Redl.
 John Osborne's 1965 play A Patriot for Me is based on Redl's story.
 A summary of Redl's career and its effect on the course of World War I is provided by Dennis Wheatley in his historical novel The Second Seal (1950). Redl's successor, Ronge, also appears as himself – chief of Austro-Hungarian Intelligence. He is trying to foil the attempts of British Intelligence to find out what Austria intends for Serbia in 1914.

Films
 Colonel Redl (dir. Hans Otto, 1925)
 The Affair of Colonel Redl (dir. Karl Anton, 1931)
 Espionage (dir. Franz Antel, 1955)
 In the 1985 film Colonel Redl, the disgraced Colonel was played by Klaus Maria Brandauer. The film, however, which was directed by István Szabó, was produced during Communist rule of Hungary and goes out of its way to demonize the Habsburg Empire. The film also fictionalizes Redl's friendship with Archduke Franz Ferdinand, who is depicted as largely responsible for the Colonel's disgrace. The film was nominated for an Academy Award for Best Foreign Film and won the Jury Prize at Cannes Film Festival in 1985.

Footnotes

References 
 Georg Markus, Der Fall Redl, 1984. 
 Robert B. Asprey, The Panther's Feast, 1959. (Jonathan Cape)

External links 
 Col. Alfred Redl

1864 births
1913 suicides
Military personnel from Lviv
People from the Kingdom of Galicia and Lodomeria
Austro-Hungarian Army officers
Austro-Hungarian people of World War I
Austrian LGBT people
Gay military personnel
Austrian military personnel who committed suicide
Secret service informants of the Russian Empire
Suicides by firearm in Austria
Traitors in history
1913 deaths